
Chuff may refer to:

Birds
 Chough, sometimes spelled as "chuff", the two crow species of the genus Pyrrhocorax:
 Alpine chough (P. graculus), or yellow-billed chough
 Red-billed chough (P. pyrrhocorax), a bird in the crow family
 White-winged chough, a bird species that is the only member of the genus Corcora

Sounds
 Prusten or chuffing, a vocalization made by tigers and snow leopards
 The sound chuff, a regular, sharp puffing sounds, as in a Steam locomotive

Other uses
 Palleus Chuff, an actor and Yoda impersonator in Sean Stewart's 2004 novel Yoda: Dark Rendezvous
 Chuff, British slang for vagina
 Chuffed, British slang for pleased